Creston High School (9-12) was the only secondary school in Creston, Washington until 2016. Now, the school is only open as an Elementary School (K-6) and a Junior High School (7-8). High School students attend school in the nearby town of Wilbur, WA. Also, note that the Junior High School serves both the Wilbur and Creston school districts

References

High schools in Lincoln County, Washington
Public high schools in Washington (state)